The VSK-94 (GRAU designation 6В8) is a 9x39mm suppressed designated marksman rifle designed in 1995 in the KBP Instrument Design Bureau by Vasily Gryazev.

Design
The VSK-94 retains the gas-driven operating principle of the 9A-91 with a rotating bolt and hammer fire mechanism. The rifle features a stamped steel receiver, skeletonized polymer stock integrated with the pistol grip and a synthetic forearm. The VSK-94 is equipped with a 4x PSO-1 optical sight (adapted for subsonic rounds shooting) and standard flip iron sights from the 9A-91.

The threaded barrel is designed to use a specifically designed suppressor.

The rifle uses 9x39mm ammunition feeding from a 20-round detachable box magazine.

Since the 9x39mm bullet weighs about twice as much as that of the 9×19mm Parabellum, its muzzle energy is about twice as high as that of a subsonic 9×19mm Parabellum bullet fired from an HK MP5SD, for example.

Users

 : Used by the Belarusian special forces
 : Used by MARCOS
 : Used by Syrian Republican Guard and special forces

See also
 9A-91
 OTs-12
 OTs-14 Groza
 SR-3
 List of Russian weaponry

References

External links

KBP Instrument Design Bureau – official site
Modern Firearms

9×39mm firearms
Silenced firearms
Takedown guns
Sniper rifles of Russia
KBP Instrument Design Bureau products
Military equipment introduced in the 1990s